Qebbet al-Turkmen, also known as Qubba, is a Turkmen village in northern Aleppo Governorate, northwestern Syria. Administratively belonging to Nahiya Ghandoura in Jarabulus District, the village has a population of 1,186 as per the 2004 census. It is located midway between Al-Rai and Jarabulus, at the western banks of Sajur River, less than a kilometer southwest of the Sajur Dam. Nearby localities include Lilawa to the north and Ghandoura to the southeast.

References

Populated places in Jarabulus District
Turkmen communities in Syria